This is a list of prisons in Chongqing, China.

References

Chongqing
Chongqing-related lists